Mount Sturt is a rural locality in the Southern Downs Region, Queensland, Australia.

History 
The locality takes its name from a railway station, which is named for the mountain, which in turn was named in June 1827 by explorer Allan Cunningham after the explorer Charles Sturt.

References 

Southern Downs Region
Localities in Queensland